Joe Bernstein (January 5, 1899 – November 12, 1975) was a poker player and road gambler.

He won one WSOP bracelet, the 1973 Limit Ace to Five Draw event.

Joe Bernstein was inducted into the Poker Hall of Fame in 1983.

World Series of Poker Bracelets

Notes

American poker players
World Series of Poker bracelet winners
1899 births
1975 deaths
Poker Hall of Fame inductees
American gamblers